MFPVP (3-Methyl-4-fluoro-α-pyrrolidinovalerophenone) is a recreational designer drug from the substituted cathinone family, with stimulant effects. It was first identified in Sweden in April 2020.

See also 
 3F-PVP
 4F-PVP
 4F-PHP
 4Cl-PVP
 4-Cl-3-MMC
 MOPVP
 DMPVP
 MDPV
 O-2390
 Pyrovalerone

References 

Pyrrolidinophenones
Designer drugs